James Smart (1847 – 22 February 1903) was a Scottish architect, prominent in the first half of the 19th century. He designed several notable buildings in Perthshire, several of which are now of listed status.

Life and career 
Smart was born in 1847 to James Smart and Ann Stewart. His father's brother was noted architect David Smart, whose career choice he opted to pursue. James had become a partner with his uncle in the firm D & J Stewart by 1887. The partnership had dissolved by 1895, possibly due to a family rift from the readmittance of James's son, John Walker Smart, to the practice. John was articled to his father in 1888, before gaining further experience with Edinburgh's Peddie & Kinnear four years later, followed by stints at McLuckie & Walker in Stirling and Dundee's Thomas Martin Cappon. He went on to work in Winnipeg, Canada.

David kept his office in Perth's Victoria Buildings at 42 Tay Street, with James opening his own business at 28 York Place, later becoming James Smart & Son.

Death 
Smart died on 22 February 1903, aged 55. He had been living at The Brae on Perth's Glasgow Road.

Selected notable works 

 Blairgowrie Methodist Church (1887) – now Category B listed
 Union Street Public Hall, Coupar Angus (1887) – now Category C listed
 St Leonard's Church, Perth (1891; additions) – now Category B listed
 6–12 Kinnoull Street, Perth (1895) – now Category C listed
 33 St John Street, Perth (1898) – now Category B listed
 Royal Bank of Scotland Buildings, Perth (1899) – now Category B listed

References 

1847 births
1903 deaths
19th-century Scottish architects
Architects from Perth, Scotland